The Former Liang (320–376) was a dynastic state, one of the Sixteen Kingdoms, in Chinese history. It was founded by the Zhang family of the Han ethnicity. Its territories included present-day Gansu and parts of Ningxia, Shaanxi, Qinghai and Xinjiang.

All rulers of the Former Liang remained largely titularly under the court of the Eastern Jin dynasty as the Duke of Xiping except Zhang Zuo who proclaimed himself wang (prince/king).  However, at times the other Former Liang rulers also used the wang title when imposed on them when they were forced to submit to their powerful neighbour states - initially the Han Zhao, then the Later Zhao, and finally Former Qin.

The official year of Former Liang's establishment is up to interpretation, as the early rulers did not explicitly declare their independence. Among the commonly accepted years are 301 (when Zhang Gui became Inspector of Liang province and gradually gained autonomy over the region), 318 (when Zhang Shi continued to use Emperor Min of Jin's reign era, Jianxing, despite Emperor Yuan changing it) and 320 (when Zhang Mao declared a general amnesty in his domain).

In 327, the Gaochang commandery was created by the Former Liang under Zhang Jun. After this, significant Han settlement occurred in Gaochang, a major, large part of the population becoming Han.

In 376, the final ruler of Former Liang Zhang Tianxi surrendered to Former Qin, ending the state. However, in the aftermath of Former Qin's defeat at the Battle of Fei River in 383 and Emperor Fu Jian's death in 385, the general Lü Guang who controlled of the region declared his own era name for 386, thus establishing the Later Liang. 

Also in 386, Zhang Tianxi's son Zhang Dayu 張大豫 claimed governorship of Liang province, and tried to re-establish Former Liang with the aid of Wang Mu (王穆), who was the Colonel of the Chang River Regiment (長水校尉) under Former Qin. In the autumn of 387 however, Lü Guang defeated and executed Zhang Dayu.

Rulers of the Former Liang

Rulers family tree

See also
Han Chinese
List of past Chinese ethnic groups
Wu Hu
Sixteen Kingdoms
Buddhism in China
Gansu
Dunhuang
Memoirs of Eminent Monks

References 

 
Dynasties in Chinese history
Former countries in Chinese history
320 establishments
4th-century establishments in China
376 disestablishments
4th-century disestablishments in China